Irene Sharaff (January 23, 1910 – August 16, 1993) was an American costume designer for stage and screen. Her work earned her five Academy Awards and a Tony Award. Sharaff is universally recognized as one of the greatest costume designers of all time.

Background
Sharaff was born in Boston to parents of Armenian descent. She studied at the New York School of Fine and Applied Arts, the Art Students League of New York, and the Académie de la Grande Chaumière in Paris.

Career

After working as a fashion illustrator in her youth, Sharaff turned to set and costume design. Her debut production was the 1931 Broadway production of Alice in Wonderland, starring Eva Le Gallienne.  Her use of silks from Thailand for The King and I (1951) created a trend in fashion and interior decoration.

Sharaff's work was featured in the movies West Side Story (Academy Award, 1961), Cleopatra (Academy Award, 1963), Meet Me in St. Louis, Hello, Dolly!, Mommie Dearest, The Other Side of Midnight, Who's Afraid of Virginia Woolf? (Academy Award, 1966), Guys and Dolls, The Best Years of Our Lives, The King and I (Academy Award, 1956), An American in Paris (Academy Award, 1951), Funny Girl and Porgy and Bess.

She also designed sets and costumes for American Ballet Theatre, the New York City Ballet, and the Ballet Russe de Monte Carlo, and contributed illustrations to fashion magazine's such as Vogue and Harper's Bazaar. Among her Broadway design credits are Idiot's Delight, Lady in the Dark, As Thousands Cheer, A Tree Grows in Brooklyn, Virginia, Flower Drum Song, and Jerome Robbins' Broadway.

The TDF/Irene Sharaff Lifetime Achievement Award was named for Sharaff.  She was its first recipient in 1993. The award is now bestowed annually to a costume designer who, over the course of his or her career, has achieved great distinction and mastery of the art in theatre, film, opera or dance.

Death
Sharaff died in New York City of congestive heart failure, complicated by emphysema, at the age of 83. She bequeathed her collection of books, along with that of her partner, Mai-Mai Sze, to the New York Society Library.

Filmography

1981 Mommie Dearest
1977 The Other Side of Midnight
1970 The Great White Hope
1969 Hello, Dolly!
1969 Justine
1968 Funny Girl
1967 The Taming of the Shrew
1967 Barbra Streisand: A Happening in Central Park
1966 Who's Afraid of Virginia Woolf? (film)
1965 The Sandpiper
1963 Cleopatra
1961 Flower Drum Song
1961 West Side Story
1960 Can-Can
1959 Porgy and Bess
1956 The King and I
1955 Guys and Dolls
1954 A Star is Born (Production Designer)
1954 Brigadoon
1953 Call Me Madam
1951 The Guy Who Came Back
1951 An American in Paris
1950 Key to the City
1949 In the Good Old Summertime
1948 Every Girl Should Be Married
1948 A Song Is Born
1947 The Unfinished Dance
1947 The Romance of Rosy Ridge
1947 The Hucksters
1947 The Secret Life of Walter Mitty
1947 Song of the Thin Man
1947 The Arnelo Affair
1947 The Beginning or the End
1947 If Winter Comes
1947 Living in a Big Way
1947 The Bishop's Wife
1946 Two Sisters from Boston
1946 The Secret Heart
1946 Courage of Lassie
1946 The Dark Mirror
1946 Love Laughs at Andy Hardy
1946 Ziegfeld Follies (Production Designer)
1946 Easy to Wed
1946 The Green Years
1946 The Hoodlum Saint
1946 The Best Years of Our Lives
1945 Twice Blessed
1945 The Valley of Decision
1945 The Picture of Dorian Gray
1945 Adventure
1945 The Hidden Eye
1945 Her Highness and the Bellboy
1944 Meet Me in St. Louis
1944 The Thin Man Goes Home
1944 Andy Hardy's Blonde Trouble
1944 Gentle Annie
1944 Broadway Rhythm 
1943 Swing Shift Maisie 
1943 A Stranger in Town
1943 I Dood It
1943 Madame Curie
1943 The Human Comedy
1941 The Devil and Miss Jones
1941 You'll Never Get Rich
1939 Eternally Yours
1938 Vivacious Lady

Awards and nominations
1977 Academy Award for The Other Side of Midnight (nominee)
1969 Academy Award for Hello, Dolly! (nominee)
1968 Tony Award for Hallelujah, Baby! (nominee)
1967 Academy Award for The Taming of the Shrew (nominee)
1966 Academy Award for Who's Afraid of Virginia Woolf? (winner)
1964 Tony Award for The Girl Who Came to Supper (nominee)
1963 Academy Award for Cleopatra (winner)
1961 Academy Award for West Side Story (winner)
1961 Academy Award for Flower Drum Song (nominee)
1960 Academy Award for Can-Can (nominee)
1959 Academy Award for Porgy and Bess (nominee)
1959 Tony Award for Flower Drum Song (nominee)
1958 Tony Award for West Side Story (nominee)  
1957 Tony Award for Shangri-La, Candide, Happy Hunting, and Small War on Murray Hill (nominee)  
1956 Academy Award for The King and I (winner)
1955 Academy Award for Guys and Dolls (nominee)
1954 Academy Award for Brigadoon (nominee)
1954 Academy Award for A Star is Born (nominee)
1954 Academy Award for Best Art Direction-Set Decoration, Color for A Star is Born (nominee)
1953 Academy Award for Call Me Madam (nominee)
1952 Tony Award for The King and I (winner)
1951 Academy Award for An American in Paris (winner)

References

Bibliography
 Sharaff, Irene. Broadway and Hollywood: Costumes Designed by Irene Sharaff, Van Nostrand Reinhold Co (1976)

External links
 
 
 Irene Sharaff Papers. Yale Collection of American Literature, Beinecke Rare Book and Manuscript Library, Yale University.
 http://www.nysoclib.org/collection/sharaff-sze-collection

1910 births
1993 deaths
American costume designers
Deaths from emphysema
Artists from Boston
Artists from New York City
Alumni of the Académie de la Grande Chaumière
Parsons School of Design alumni
American people of Armenian descent
Best Costume Design Academy Award winners
American lesbian artists
LGBT fashion designers
LGBT people from New York (state)
LGBT people from Massachusetts
Tony Award winners
20th-century American LGBT people